Josep María Nogués Salvatella (born 29 April 1959) is a Spanish retired footballer who played as a midfielder, and a manager.

Managerial career
Born in Barcelona, Catalonia, Nogués has previously coached teams in the Tercera and Segunda División, which includes L'Hospitalet (1993–1995), Terrassa (1995–1996), Gimnàstic de Tarragona (1997–1999), Real Jaén (2002–2004), Girona (2005), Écija Balompié (2007–2008) and Betis reserve team, Real Betis B (2008–2009).

On 6 April 2009, Nogués was appointed the new manager of Real Betis after the sacking of Paco Chaparro. His first game in charge ended in a 3–2 win over Racing de Santander, followed by two losses to Valencia 1–2 and Atlético Madrid 0–2. Nogués won his second game against Sporting de Gijón 2–0.
He managed clubs in Algeria first with Paradou AC in 2016 to 2018 and a short spell with CA Bordj Bou Arreridj in 2018.

References

External links

1959 births
Living people
Footballers from Barcelona
Spanish footballers
Association football midfielders
Segunda División B players
Tercera División players
CF Reus Deportiu players
CE Júpiter players
Spanish football managers
La Liga managers
CE L'Hospitalet managers
Terrassa FC managers
Gimnàstic de Tarragona managers
Real Jaén managers
Girona FC managers
Écija Balompié managers
Real Betis managers
Polideportivo Ejido managers
Expatriate football managers in Algeria
Spanish expatriates in Algeria
Paradou AC managers